Euchomenella moluccarum is a species of mantis in the family Deroplatyidae. It is found in the Maluku Islands and in Malaysia.

References 

Deroplatyinae
Insects described in 1872
Insects of Malaysia
Insects of Indonesia